Men's Combined World Cup 1993/1994

Final point standings
In Men's Combined World Cup 1993/94 both results count.

Note:

In all competitions not all points were awarded (not enough finishers).

World Cup
FIS Alpine Ski World Cup men's combined discipline titles